The Monocystidae are a family of parasitic alveolates in the phylum Apicomplexa.

Taxonomy

There are five subfamilies in this family: Monocystinae, Oligochaetocystinae, Rhynchocystinae, Stomatophorinae and Zygocystinae.

History

This family was created by Bütschli in 1882.

Description

The hosts of the species in this family are usually oligochaetes.

The species in this family generally infect the coelom of their hosts.

The gamonts are spherical to cylindrical. The anterior end is little differentiated if at all.

The oocysts are biconical or boat-shaped.

References

Apicomplexa families